Carlo Carli (born 13 December 1945, Pietrasanta, Lucca) is an Italian politician.

A long-time member of the Italian Socialist Party (PSI), in 1994 he founded the Labour Federation (FL) and joined the Democrats of the Left (DS) in 1998. Since then, he was the leader of the Socialist faction within DS. He was deputy from 1994 to 2006.

References

1945 births
Living people
People from Pietrasanta
Italian Socialist Party politicians
Labour Federation (Italy) politicians
Democrats of the Left politicians
Democratic Party (Italy) politicians
21st-century Italian politicians
Members of the Chamber of Deputies (Italy)
Politicians of Tuscany